Malcolm Bramley is a former Australian rules footballer, who played for the Fitzroy Football Club in the Victorian Football League (VFL).

References

External links

Fitzroy Football Club players
1959 births
Living people
Australian rules footballers from Victoria (Australia)